The following highways are numbered 2. For roads numbered A2, see list of A2 roads.  For roads numbered B2, see list of B2 roads.  For roads numbered M2, see list of M2 roads. For roads numbered N2, see list of N2 roads.

International
 Asian Highway 2, an international road from Indonesia to Iran
 European route E2 
 European route E002
 Trans-Sahara Highway

Albania
 SH-2 Highway in Albania from Tirana to Durrës.

Argentina
 Buenos Aires Provincial Route 2

Australia

New South Wales 
 M2 Hills Motorway 
 Lane Cove Tunnel 
 Windsor Road (Sydney) 
 Gold Coast Highway (Queensland, New South Wales)

Northern Territory 
 (future )Namatjira Drive

Queensland 
 
Ipswich Motorway (Brisbane)
Warrego Highway (Brisbane)
 
Logan Motorway (Brisbane)
Gateway Motorway (Brisbane)
 Warrego ( Toowoomba Bypass), Landsborough, and Barkly Highways (Queensland)
 Warrego and Mitchell Highway
 Gold Coast Highway (Queensland, New South Wales)
 Brisbane

South Australia 
 
Southern Expressway
North-South Motorway
Northern Expressway

South Road, Adelaide

Tasmania 
 Bass Highway, Tasmania

Victoria 
 Tullamarine Freeway (Melbourne)
 CityLink Tolled Freeway

Western Australia 
 State Route 2 (Western Australia) – Mitchell Freeway, Kwinana Freeway, and Forrest Highway

Austria 
 Süd Autobahn

Bangladesh
 N2 - Dhaka–Sylhet Highway

Belarus
 M2 highway (Belarus)

Belgium
  R2 road (Belgium)

Bulgaria
  Републикански път I-2/Route 2 (I-2/E70)
 30px   Автомагистрала „Хемус“ (A2/E73/E83/E772)

Burma
National Highway 2 (Burma)

Cambodia
National Highway 2 (Cambodia)

Canada 
  Alberta Highway 2 (including the Queen Elizabeth II Highway)
  British Columbia Highway 2
  Manitoba Highway 2
  New Brunswick Route 2 (part of the Trans-Canada Highway)
  Newfoundland and Labrador Route 2
  Northwest Territories Highway 2
  Nova Scotia Trunk 2
  Ontario Highway 2 (almost entirely removed from the network)
 Prince Edward Island Route 2
  Quebec Route 2 (former)
  Saskatchewan Highway 2
  Yukon Highway 2

China 
  G2 Expressway

Congo, Democratic Republic of the 
 National Road 2 (Democratic Republic of the Congo)

Costa Rica
 National Route 2

Czech Republic 
 D2 from Brno to Bratislava in Slovakia
 I/2 Highway (in Czech)

Djibouti
  RN-2 (Djibouti)

Dominican Republic
  DR-2

Finland
 Finnish national road 2
 Åland Islands Highway 2

France
 Route nationale 2

Germany
  Bundesautobahn 2
  Bundesstraße 2

Greece
 Εθνική Οδός 2 (EO2) 
   Εγνατία Οδός (A2/E90)

Hong Kong 
  Route 2 (Hong Kong)

Hungary
 M2 expressway (Hungary)
 Main road 2 (Hungary)

India
 National Highway 2 (India)
State Highway 2 (Rajasthan)
State Highway 2 (Andhra Pradesh)
State Highway 2 (West Bengal)

Indonesia
  Indonesian National Route 2

Iran
  Freeway 2 (Iran)

Iraq
  Highway 2 (Iraq)

Ireland
 M2 motorway (Republic of Ireland)
 N2 road (Ireland)

Israel
 Highway 2 (Israel)

Italy
 Autostrada A2
 Autostrada A2 (old)
 RA 2
 T2
 State road 2

Japan

 Route 2 (Shuto Expressway) in Tokyo
 Route 2 (Nagoya Expressway)
 Route 2 (Hanshin Expressway) in Osaka

Korea, South
 National Route 2

Malaysia
 Malaysia Federal Route 2

Mexico
 Mexican Federal Highway 2

Moldova
 National Road 2 (R2)
  M2 highway (M2/E584) is a national road with highway status. This route leaves Chișinău, via Orhei and the route arrives at Soroca, on the border with Ukraine

Netherlands
 Rijksweg 2

New Zealand
 New Zealand State Highway 2

Pakistan
 M-2 motorway (Pakistan)

Paraguay
 National Route 2

Peru
 Peru Highway 2

Philippines
 Circumferential Road 2
 Radial Road 2
 N2 highway (Philippines)
 E2 expressway (Philippines)

Poland 
  National road 2 (DK2)
   Motorway of Freedom (A2/E30)
  expressway S2, Southern Warsaw Bypass

Romania
     National Road 2 (DN2/E58/E60/E85/E583)
 DN2A
 DN2B 
  Autostrada Soarelui (A2/E81)

Russia
 M2 highway (Russia)

South Africa
 N2 road (South Africa)
M2 (East London)
M1 (Johannesburg)
M2 (Pretoria)
M2 (Durban)

Senegal
 N2 road (Senegal)

Sri Lanka

 Galle Road
 Colombo Inter-provincial Orbital Router

Taiwan
 Freeway 2 (Taiwan)
 Provincial Highway 2 (Taiwan)

Thailand
 Thailand Route 2 (Mittraphap Road)

Turkey
  , a motorway in Turkey as the outer half ring road in Istanbul.

United Kingdom
 M2 motorway (Great Britain)
 A2 road (England)
 M2 motorway (Northern Ireland)
 A2 road (Northern Ireland)

United States 
 Interstate 2
 Interstate A-2 (Alaska; unsigned)
 Interstate H-2 (Hawaii)
 U.S. Route 2
 U.S. Route 2N (former)
 U.S. Route 2S (former)
 New England Interstate Route 2 (former)
 Alabama State Route 2
 Alaska Route 2
 Arkansas Highway 2 (former)
 California State Route 2
 Colorado State Highway 2
 Connecticut Route 2
 Delaware Route 2
 Florida State Road 2
 County Road 2 (Nassau County, Florida)
 County Road 2 (Okaloosa County, Florida)
 County Road 2B (Okaloosa County, Florida)
 County Road 2 (Walton County, Florida)
 Georgia State Route 2
  Illinois Route 2
 Indiana State Road 2
 Iowa Highway 2
 K-2 (Kansas highway)
 Kentucky Route 2
 Louisiana Highway 2
 Louisiana State Route 2 (former)
 Maryland Route 2
 Massachusetts Route 2
 County Road 2 (Goodhue County, Minnesota)
 County Road 2 (Hennepin County, Minnesota)
 County Road 2 (Pine County, Minnesota)
 County Road 2 (Scott County, Minnesota)
 County Road 2 (Washington County, Minnesota)
 Mississippi Highway 2
 Missouri Route 2
 Missouri Route 2 (1922) (former)
 Montana Highway 2
 Nebraska Highway 2
 Nebraska Spur 2B
 Nebraska Recreation Road 2D
 Nevada State Route 2  (former)
 Nevada State Route 2B (former)
 Nevada State Route 2C (former)
 New Jersey Route 2 (former)
 New Jersey Route 2N (former)
 County Route 2 (Monmouth County, New Jersey)
 New Mexico State Road 2
 New York State Route 2
 County Route 2 (Allegany County, New York)
 County Route 2 (Chemung County, New York)
 County Route 2 (Chenango County, New York)
 County Route 2 (Clinton County, New York)
 County Route 2 (Columbia County, New York)
 County Route 2 (Delaware County, New York)
 County Route 2 (Dutchess County, New York)
 County Route 2 (Erie County, New York)
 County Route 2 (Essex County, New York)
 County Route 2 (Franklin County, New York)
 County Route 2 (Genesee County, New York)
 County Route 2 (Lewis County, New York)
 County Route 2 (Madison County, New York)
 County Route 2 (Monroe County, New York)
 County Route 2 (Nassau County, New York)
 County Route 2 (Niagara County, New York)
 County Route 2 (Oneida County, New York)
 County Route 2 (Onondaga County, New York)
 County Route 2 (Ontario County, New York)
 County Route 2 (Oswego County, New York)
 County Route 2 (Rensselaer County, New York)
 County Route 2 (Steuben County, New York)
 County Route 2 (Suffolk County, New York)
 County Route 2 (Washington County, New York)
 County Route 2 (Yates County, New York)
 North Carolina Highway 2
 Ohio State Route 2
 Oklahoma State Highway 2
 Oregon Route 2 (former)
 Pennsylvania Route 2 (former)
 Rhode Island Route 2
 South Carolina Highway 2
 Tennessee State Route 2
 Texas State Highway 2 (former)
 Texas State Highway Loop 2
 Farm to Market Road 2
 Texas Park Road 2
 Texas Recreational Road 2
 Utah State Route 2 (former)
 Vermont Route 2B
 Virginia State Route 2
 Washington State Highway 2 (former)
 West Virginia Route 2

Territories 
  Guam Highway 2
  Interstate PR-2 (unsigned)
  Puerto Rico Highway 2
 Puerto Rico Highway 2R

Ukraine
 Highway M02 (Ukraine)

Uruguay 
  Route 2 Grito de Asencio

See also